Andy Capp is a British sitcom based on the cartoon Andy Capp. It starred James Bolam and ran for one series in 1988. It was written by Keith Waterhouse. Unusually, for a sitcom at the time, there was neither a studio audience nor a laugh track during the filming of Andy Capp, and was filmed entirely on location. It was made for the ITV network by Thames Television.

Cast
James Bolam - Andrew "Andy" Capp
Paula Tilbrook - Flo Capp
Mike Savage - Bookie
Keith Smith - Chalkie
George Waring - Clifford
John Arthur - Jack
Jeremy Gittins - Keith
Andy Mulligan - Meredith
Ian Bleasdale - Milkie
Shirley Dixon - Mother-in-law
Richard Tate - Pawnbroker
Keith Marsh - Percy
Susan Brown - Ruby
Colette Stevenson - Shirley
Ian Thompson - The Vicar
Kevin Lloyd - Walter
Philip Lowrie - Mr Watson

Plot
The sitcom Andy Capp was based on the cartoon strip of the same name that had run since 1957 in The Daily Mirror. Andy Capp is a slothful man from Hartlepool, whose life consists of drinking, sleeping, watching TV, betting, going to the pub and occasionally playing football (as opposed to rugby, which was Andy's sport in the comic strip). His wife, Flo, is constantly annoyed by her lazy husband and frequently uses a rolling pin as a weapon.

Episodes
"New Leaf" (22 February 1988)
"The Sporting Life" (29 February 1988)
"Flo's New Frock!" (7 March 1988)
"Love me or leave me?" (14 March 1988)
"Economy Drive" (21 March 1988)
"The Anniversary Waltz" (28 March 1988)

DVD release
The Complete Series of Andy Capp was released by [Network DVD in the UK (Region 2) on 11 June 2012.

References

External links

British TV Comedy Guide for Andy Capp

1988 British television series debuts
1988 British television series endings
1980s British sitcoms
ITV sitcoms
Television series by Fremantle (company)
Television shows produced by Thames Television
Television shows based on comic strips
English-language television shows